Ellipsoptera is a genus of beetles in the family Cicindelidae, containing the following species:

 Ellipsoptera blanda (Dejean, 1831)
 Ellipsoptera cuprascens (Leconte, 1852)
 Ellipsoptera gratiosa (Guerin-Meneville, 1840)
 Ellipsoptera hamata (Audouin & Brulle, 1839)
 Ellipsoptera hirtilabris (Leconte, 1875)
 Ellipsoptera lepida (Dejean, 1831)
 Ellipsoptera macra (Leconte, 1857)
 Ellipsoptera marginata (Fabricius, 1775)
 Ellipsoptera marutha (Dow, 1911)
 Ellipsoptera nevadica (Leconte, 1875)
 Ellipsoptera puritana (G. Horn, 1871)
 Ellipsoptera sperata (Leconte, 1857)
 Ellipsoptera wapleri (Leconte, 1875)

References

Cicindelidae